Sivasankari (born 14 October 1942) is an Indian author and activist who writes in Tamil. She is one of the four Tamil writers asked by the United States Library of Congress to record their voice as part of the South Asian article on Sivashankari.

Early life
Sivasankari was born in Madras. Including herself, all the children in her family were educated in the Sri Ramakrishna Mission and Sarada Vidyalaya schools. She then studied at SIET College for Women.

Career
Her novels were made into the films Avan Aval Adhu (1980) Novel Oru Singam Muyalagiradhu Directed by Muktha Srinivasan (125days)  47 Natkal (1981) directed by K. Balachander and starred Chiranjeevi and Jaya Prada. She is the author of the novel, which was made into a TV series called Subah on Doordarshan in 1987.

Books

47 Naatkal
Aatril Oru Kaal Setril Oru Kaal
Aayiram Kaalathu Payir
Adimaadugal
Anilgal
Amma Pillai
Amma, Please, Enakkaga
Appa
Aval
En?
Ini
Innoruthi + Innoruthi
Karunai Kolai
Kinattru Thavalaigal
Kulappangal
Malaiyin Adutha Pakkam
Mella Mella
Mudhal Konal
Naan Naanaga
Nandu
Nerunji Mul
Nooleni
Oru Manithanin Kathai
Paalangal
Pogapoga
Suriya Vamsam Ninaivalaigal - 1
Suriya Vamsam Ninaivalaigal - 2
Sutta Man
Theppakulam
Thirisangu Sorgam
Uyarnthavargal
Vaanathu Nila

Filmography
Avan Aval Adhu (1980)
47 Natkal (1981)
Nandu (1981)
Kutty (2001)

Notes

External links
 http://www.sivasankari.com/
 Library of Congress page on Sivasankari
Woman of the Week, The Hindu March 25, 2006

1942 births
Living people
Recipients of the Saraswati Samman Award
Writers from Chennai
20th-century Indian novelists
Indian women novelists
International Writing Program alumni
Women writers from Tamil Nadu
20th-century Indian women writers
Novelists from Tamil Nadu
Tamil-language writers